Qarah Quyunlu (also Romanized as Qarah Qūyūnlū and Qarāqūyūnlū) is a village in Nazlu-e Shomali Rural District, Nazlu District, Urmia County, West Azerbaijan Province, Iran. At the 2006 census, its population was 22, in 7 families.

References 

Populated places in Urmia County